The 2011 Winston-Salem Open was a men's tennis tournament played on outdoor hard courts. It was previously known as the Pilot Pen Tennis but was relocated to Winston-Salem. It was the 43rd edition of the Winston-Salem Open, and was part of the ATP World Tour 250 series of the 2011 ATP World Tour. It took place at the Wake Forest University in Winston-Salem, North Carolina, United States, from August 22 through August 27, 2011. It was the last event on the 2011 US Open Series before the 2011 US Open.

Fourth-seeded John Isner won the singles title.

ATP entrants

Seeds

 Seedings are based on the rankings of August 15, 2011.

Other entrants
The following players received wildcards into the singles main draw
  Ryan Harrison
  Lleyton Hewitt
  Andy Roddick
  Donald Young

The following players received entry from the qualifying draw:

  Julien Benneteau
  Ricardo Mello
  Kei Nishikori
  Michael Russell

The following players received entry from a lucky loser spot:
  Édouard Roger-Vasselin
  Pierre-Ludovic Duclos

Finals

Singles

 John Isner defeated  Julien Benneteau, 4–6, 6–3, 6–4
It was Isner's 2nd title of the year and 3rd of his career.

Doubles

 Jonathan Erlich /  Andy Ram defeated  Christopher Kas /  Alexander Peya, 7–6(7–2), 6–4

External links
Official website

Winston-Salem Open
Winston-Salem Open
Winston-Salem Open
Winston-Salem Open
Winston-Salem Open